Delfin, formerly the Development Finance Company Ltd (DFC)  was a business carrying out residential developments. It was acquired by Lendlease in 2001.

History
Delfin was established as the Development Finance Company by John Marks in 1953. DFC became a public company in 1957 and was listed on the stock exchange in 1959.  The purpose of DFC was to serve as an "investment banking service" that would "assist Australia’s industrial development by providing long-term finance and permanent capital to Australian companies."
The abbreviation “DelFin” was used in the names of some of DFC's subsidiary companies.

DFC entered the real estate development market in 1969. Via an indenture signed by its subsidiary, Delfin Management Services Pty Ltd and the Government of South Australia, Delfin built a real estate development called West Lakes. West Lakes is in the upper estuary  of the Port River, known as the Upper Port Reach, to the north-west of the Adelaide city centre.

In 1983, DFC was acquired by ANZ Bank.

After separating from ANZ, Delfin Property Group was acquired by Lendlease in 2001 for $172 million (AUD). Upon acquisition, Delfin Property Group was de-listed and became Delfin Lend Lease, a subsidiary company of Lendlease.

References

Financial services companies based in Sydney
Investment companies of Australia
Companies listed on the Australian Securities Exchange
Lendlease
Shopping center management firms
Real estate companies of Australia

fr:Lend Lease Corporation
wuu:Lend Lease